Michael Patrick Murray (born 14 May 1930) is an English retired banker, cricketer and administrator.

He was born in Westminster and represented Middlesex as a right-handed batsman in 1952 and 1953. He also captained Beddington C.C. and the Middlesex 2nd XI.

He led a successful banking career with Lloyd's Bank. He joined the Middlesex County Cricket Club Cricket Committee in 1958 and the General Committee in 1960. He served as Treasurer (1975–1984), Chairman (1984–1993) and President (1997–1998). He also chaired the Test and County Cricket Board Finance Committee and published "The Murray Report" in 1992, which recommended the introduction of Four Day County Championship Cricket.

References

1930 births
Living people
People from Westminster
Chairmen of Middlesex County Cricket Club
English cricketers
Middlesex cricketers
Presidents of Middlesex County Cricket Club
Marylebone Cricket Club cricketers
Combined Services cricketers